Schiedea membranacea is a rare species of flowering plant in the pink family known by the common name papery schiedea and membranous schiedea. It is endemic to Hawaii, where it is known only from the island of Kauai. It is threatened by the degradation and destruction of its habitat. It is a federally listed endangered species of the United States.

This plant is a perennial herb growing from a woody caudex. The stem grows up to a meter long and has no branches.

This plant has declined recently. In 1996 there were six populations of the plant totalling at least 250 individuals. In 2010 there were five populations with fewer than 90 plants. The species grows in moist and wet forest habitat, often on steep cliffs.

Threats to the species include feral goats, feral pigs, introduced species of plants, and garlic snails (Oxychilus alliarius).

References

External links
USDA Plants Profile

membranacea
Endemic flora of Hawaii
Plants described in 1972